Joe E. Newsome High School is a public high school that was established in 2003 on Fishhawk Boulevard in Lithia, Florida, United States. It is named in honor of Joe E. Newsome, a Plant City pharmacist and businessman who served as a board member of the School District of Hillsborough County, Florida, for 24 years.

The school colors are Carolina Blue, Navy, and white. Its mascot is the wolf. The student newspaper is known as Wolf Tracks.

Demographics 
As of the 2020–2021 school year Newsome had 2,978  students enrolled. Of these students 0.3% were American Indian/Alaska Native, 4.37%  Asian, 6.01% Black, 14.57% Hispanic, 0.2% Native Hawaiian/ Pacific Islander, 68.5%White, and 6.25% were two or more races.

Academics 
In 2013, Newsome was judged the best public school in Hillsborough County at educating students for college by Newsweek.

Graduation rate
In 2012 Newsome's graduation rate was 98% as compared to a statewide rate of 74.5% and a Hillsborough County rate of 72.6%.

Florida Department of Education grade
2018 A 
2017 A 
2016 A 
2015 A 
2014 A 
2013 A 
2012 A 
2011 B 
2010 B 
2009 B 
2008 B

Athletics

Hockey
Newsome won the state hockey championship in 2009 and again in 2022.

Softball
Newsome won the state softball championship in 2015

Flag Football
Newsome won the 2A state flag football championship in 2021.

Chorus
In 2009, the Newsome Chorus captured the Grand Champion Trophy, at the Fiesta-Val national competition.  In 2016 the chorus performed for the archbishop at Kilkenny Castle, Ireland.

Marching Band
The Newsome Wolf Pack Marching Band won first place in Bands of America regionals in Delaware with their performance “Flight: If Only I Could.” The following year they were selected to march in the 2016 Macy's Thanksgiving Day Parade, the only school in Florida to receive an invitation.

Notable people
 Ana Cate, soccer player
 Orlando Greene, Olympic runner, is a coach at Newsome.
 Will Worth, football player.

References

External links
Joe E. Newsome High School website

Educational institutions established in 2003
High schools in Hillsborough County, Florida
Public high schools in Florida
2003 establishments in Florida